Ramsha Khan (born ) is a Pakistani actress who appears in Urdu television. She made her acting debut with coming-of-age drama film Thora Jee Le (2016). Khan has appeared in several notable serials including Mah-e-Tamaam (2018), Kaisa Hai Naseeban (2019), Ishqiya (2020), Ghisi Piti Mohabbat (2021) and Hum Tum (2022).

Filmography

Television

Special appearances

Telefilm

Awards and nomination

References

External links

Living people
21st-century Pakistani actresses
Pakistani television actresses
Pakistani film actresses
1994 births